Jean-Michel Thierry de Crussol (1916–2011) was a French physician and art historian. His specialities are in Byzantine and Armenian art.

He was born on 13 August 1916 in Bagnères de Luchon, France. He studied and got his education in Paris. He co-wrote the book Armenian Art in 1989 and also wrote many articles concerning Armenian art, especially Armenian architecture.

Works 
 
 
 

 Eglises et couvents du Karabagh
 Monuments arméniens du Vaspurakan
 Les Arts arméniens
 Le Couvent arménien d'Horomos
 La Cathédrale des Saints-Apôtres de Kars, 930-943

References

External links 
  Jean-Michel Thierry on ACAM's biographies of authors
  Jean-Michel Thierry de Crussol on Bibliomonde biographies of authors

1916 births
2011 deaths
French art historians
Armenian studies scholars
French Byzantinists
20th-century French physicians
People from Haute-Garonne
French male non-fiction writers